Bazin (or basin) stems from the Italian word "" meaning cotton wadding. It is a cotton damask or brocade fabric imported in West African countries from Europe or Asia. In Senegal, bazin fabric was introduced with the arrival of the French and was used to make a Boubou, a long loose traditional outerwear, worn by men and women mostly in West Africa and the West African Diaspora.

Background 

Boubou (also bubu; from wolof ,  or ) originates from the Wolof word , meaning a garment that can be slipped on over the head and used generically to describe long, flowing, ankle length robes worn by both men and women across Muslim West Africa from Senegal to Nigeria. The traditional boubou is an ample tunic with open sleeves and a triangular or rectangular breast pocket. Boubou both formal and everyday wear is made in all different materials for both men and women. Aside from being comfortable and practical it provides covering in accordance to Islamic beliefs. Usually Boubou is constructed in three  parts.

In Senegal, the most elegant boubous  are made from high quality cotton damask, the bazin riche. They are heavily embroidered with the same color or contrasting silk thread. Ornate embroidered patterns of circles and swirls adorn the pockets, neck opening, front, back and other parts of the gown depending on the design.

White and light blue are the classic colors and are commonly worn in Mauritania, Western Sahara, Mali and Niger. Bright colors with multicolor embroidery are worn in Senegal and Gambia. Less expensive boubous are made from lower quality cotton damask fabric imported from China or India and usually have no embroidery.[Madison and Hansen, pg. 69]

Traditionally the Senegalese boubou can be heavily embroidered, it is also known by various names depending on the ethnic group and the region in which it is being worn. In Senegal everyday wear is a caftan, or boubou with pants for the men and pagne a garment that women wrap around their hips and wear under a boubou.[Madison and Hansen, pg 126, 176]

In Niger a similar type of boubou is worn. And Tuareg men commonly wear wrap turbans and face veils. In Mali, traditional clothing made of white mud cloth and associated with the towns of Djenne and Timbuktu was the type of luxury boubou, and the lomasa primarily associated with the Tunka, the ruler of Ngalam, once a Soninke kingdom in present-day Senegal.

Technique 

The informal sector of trade in dyed fabric also called thioup or thioub in Wolof, expanded in the 1980s. As a consequence fabrics such as bazin revived a boom in the fashion sector. Until 2000s cotton damask used to be worked by local craftsmen to become a noble fabric characterized by its stiffness and dazzling shine. However this craft slowly died out due to cheap competition from neighboring countries. Dyed bazin is now mainly imported in Senegal, they are then designed and sewn by local tailors who in turn export their products in West African countries and other parts of the world.

The first step in this craftsmanship is to dye the white fabric oftentimes with patterns made through a technique called  in Wolof. When the fabric is soaked in the dye bath, that technique makes it possible to preserve certain parts of the fabric, from dyeing and to form patterns in rings or strips. The fabric is then starched and beaten with wooden clubs by  until it results in a shiny noble bazin.

It is this bazin that is skillfully turned into luxurious intricate clothing by Senegalese tailors that the entire sub region from Guinea to Nigeria wear. Its high demand, especially during holidays, as well as the many stages of manufacture make it occupy a place of choice in the economy. Senegalese boubous are mainly exported in neighboring countries such as  Gambia and Mali.

La grande nuit du bazin 
It's a festival of boubous, brilliance, colors and a delight to watch. Famous Senegalese designers and pioneers of modern Senegalese fashion such as Oumou Sy, Collé Ardo Sow, Diouma Dieng Diakhaté but also other designers from other countries are invited to that event. The success of la grande nuit du bazin lead to other branches in Bamako and Abidjan successively in 2014 and 2018. Djiby Dramé also intended to spread the  internationally and within the African diaspora. In this regard, he said "Since 2004, I have been organizing the event outside of Senegal, to introduce it to Africans in the diaspora. This year, after Dakar, we will go to Paris, London and the United States where the event is eagerly awaited by the fans."

Gallery

References 

Society of Senegal
Senegalese culture
Senegalese fashion designers
African clothing
Robes and cloaks